Louise Candlish is a British author. In 2019, her crime novel Our House won the Crime & Thriller Book of the Year award at the British Book Awards. In 2021, the novel was adapted into an ITV drama starring Tuppence Middleton and Martin Compston. She is also the author of The Other Passenger, which was a Richard & Judy Book Club pick, The Heights (2021) and Those People (2019).

References

External links
 

Living people
20th-century English novelists
20th-century English women writers
21st-century English novelists
21st-century English women writers
British Book Award winners
British crime fiction writers
English women novelists
Year of birth missing (living people)